The 2006 Molson Grand Prix of Toronto was the seventh round of the 2006 Bridgestone Presents the Champ Car World Series Powered by Ford season, held on July 9, 2006 on the streets of Exhibition Place in Toronto, Ontario, Canada.  Justin Wilson took the pole but A. J. Allmendinger took the win, his third consecutive race victory.

Qualifying results

Race

Caution flags

Notes

 New Race Record A. J. Allmendinger 1:38:01.286
 Average Speed 92.386 mph

Championship standings after the race

Drivers' Championship standings

 Note: Only the top five positions are included.

External links
 Friday Qualifying Results 
 Saturday Qualifying Results 
 Race Results
 Weather Information

Toronto
Indy Toronto
Molson Grand Prix
2006 in Toronto